Augustin Schoeffler (1822–1851) was a French saint and martyr in the Catholic Church and a member of the Paris Foreign Missions Society. He was a priest in Lorraine who joined the Foreign Missions of Paris. He worked as a missionary to Indochina and was one of two French missionaries killed in northern Vietnam between 1847 and 1851. At the time, it was illegal to proselytize in Vietnam.

His feast day is May 1 (May 2 locally in France).

Early life and education
Augustin Schoeffler was born on the 22 of November, 1822, in Mittelbronn, France. He was baptized the next day. From 1834 to 1842 he studied at the minor seminary of Pont-à-Mousson and the college of Phalsbourg. From 1842 to 1846 Schoeffler studied Philosophy at the major seminary of Nancy. On the 5 October 1846, he began training in the Seminary of Foreign Missions of Paris. On May 29, 1847, Augustin Schoeffler was ordained a priest in Paris.

Missionary life
On November 18, 1847, Father Schoeffler left Antwerp arriving in Tonkin on July 6, 1848. From 1848 to 1851 he worked as missionary while learning the Vietnamese language. In the spring of 1850 his bishop gave him the task of evangelizing Son Tay in the north. Schoeffler was arrested on March 1, 1851, and on March 5 found guilty of proselytizing. He was beheaded on May 1, 1851, at Son Tay.

As Father Schoeffler walked to his place of execution, a placard, which read, "He preached truly the whole charge of preaching the religion of Jesus. His crime is patent. Let Mr. Augustin be beheaded, and cast into a stream." was carried before him. Augustin Schoeffler's head was thrown into the Red River, and was never recovered. The crowd rushed to collect relics. Some even uprooted the grass that was stained with his blood. His body was buried on the site of his execution. Two days later, local Christians exhumed the body and reburied it in a Christian village nearby.

Veneration
On September 24, 1857, Augustin Schoeffler was declared Venerable by Pope Pius IX. He was beatified by Pope Leo XIII on May 7, 1900. He was made a saint by Pope John Paul II on June 19, 1988.

The Rue St Augustin Schoeffler is located in Mittelbronn.

Relics
As of May 10, 2009, a relic of Augustin Schoeffler can be found at the Assumption Grotto Church in Detroit, Michigan. Descendants of Schoeffler's family live in the area and attend the church.

References

External links
 Archives of the Paris Foreign Missions Society
 http://www.santiebeati.it/dettaglio/51590
 https://web.archive.org/web/20130308174335/http://www.op-stjoseph.org/dom-images/pdf-files/witnesses.pdf

1822 births
1851 deaths
People from Moselle (department)
19th-century Christian saints
19th-century executions by Vietnam
19th-century Roman Catholic martyrs
Roman Catholic missionaries in Vietnam
French people executed abroad
French Roman Catholic saints
Vietnamese Roman Catholic saints
Martyred Roman Catholic priests
Paris Foreign Missions Society missionaries
Christian martyrs executed by decapitation
People executed by Vietnam by decapitation
1851 in Vietnam
Executed people from Lorraine